The  was a Japanese coin worth one-hundredth of a Japanese yen, as 100 sen equalled 1 yen. One sen coins were first struck for circulation during the 6th year of Meiji's reign (1873) using a dragon design. The denomination had been adopted in 1871 but coinage at the time could not be carried out. Aside from an alloy change and a new rice stalk wreath design, one sen coins remained the same weight and size for the remainder of the era. The situation changed when World War I broke out under Emperor Taishō as rising metal costs led to a size and weight reduction. These smaller coins were first produced in 1916 with a paulownia design which was seen as liberal at the time. Emperor Shōwa took the throne in 1926, and Japan was pushed into a militaristic regime by the early 1930s causing metals to be set aside for wartime conditions. These effects would later impact one sen coins through numerous alloy, size, and design changes.

Bronze was the first alloy to be used for coinage which was replaced by brass, then aluminium in the span of a single year (1938). One sen coins were made lighter and were reduced in size as World War II raged on causing a demand for material to make military supplies. The last coins were produced from 1944 to 1945 using a tin and zinc based alloy as the situation further deteriorated. Shortly before the war ended porcelain coins were struck but not issued, these were later destroyed. One sen coins were discontinued at the end of the war, and were demonetized at the end of 1953 along with other subsidiary coinage. Collectors now trade these coins on the market where their value depends on survivability rate and condition.

History

Meiji and Taishō (1873–1924)

One sen coins along with twelve other denominations were adopted by the Meiji government in an act signed on June 27, 1871. This new coinage gave Japan a western style decimal system based on units of yen, which were broken down into subsidiary currency of sen, and rin. The first coins that were minted are trial strikes or pattern coins, which are dated 1869 (year 2) and 1870 (year 3). No coins were struck for circulation right away as the technology to produce the coins was poor at the time. Silver and gold coins were produced and distributed to the market before copper coinage could be carried out. One sen coins were eventually introduced on August 29, 1873 via government notification. Each coin was authorized to be struck in an alloy of copper, weighs 110 grains (7.13g), and has a 1.10 inch diameter (27.9mm). The obverse features a dragon with the date of reign, while on the reverse a wreath design is used with a Chrysanthemum seal located above surrounded by the words "100 for one yen" in Kanji. The value "1 sen" is written in English on the obverse, and in Kanji on the reverse. These coins were legal tender only up to the amount of 1 yen which was fixed by government regulations.

Production continued for a few years before it was stopped as no coins are dated from year 11 or 12 (1878 and 1879). It is theorized that the aftermath of the Satsuma Rebellion could have left an impact. When production resumed in 1880 (year 13), the scales on the obverse dragon design were changed from a square to a "V" shaped pattern. One sen coins using the first dragon design were made again until 1888 (year 21), when they were stopped due to mass production and a slight oversupply. As with several other denominations it's possible that non circulating one sen dragon coins were made again in 1892 (year 25) for display at the World's Columbian Exposition. The Japanese government officially switched to the gold standard on October 1, 1897 and new coinage laws were adopted. Changes for the one sen coin included a reduction of copper content by 3%, while the weight and size of the coins were left the same as before. Both sides of the coin received a brand new design as some of the older elements were no longer viewed positively. The dragon on the obverse side in particular was removed due to the First Sino-Japanese War which lasted from 1894 to 1895. A rice stalk wreath was chosen to replace the dragon, while the reverse side of the coin received a sunburst design.

One sen coins continued to be struck for circulation in the Meiji era until 1902 (year 35). While coins dated 1906 and 1909 (year 39 and 42) were struck, none were apparently released for circulation. Production later resumed under Emperor Taishō in 1913 and World War I broke out in the following year. This event brought Japan a booming economy which required an increase of small denomination coins. At the same time rising metal costs to produce the coins became an issue, and their large size had made them difficult to distribute. Pattern coins were made in 1915 and again in 1916 to test out a smaller design which debuted in the latter year. This new design features the paulownia coat of arms, is 23.03 mm in diameter, and weighs 3.75g. The paulownia design was controversial at the time and seen as a liberal democratic trend which was criticized by those in the right wing. One sen coins with this design continued to be produced until 1924 (year 13 of Taishō) without any additional changes.

Shōwa (1927–1953)

Production of the one sen coin continued during Emperor Shōwa's 2nd year of reign in 1927, using the paulownia design. Meanwhile events around the world including the Great Depression were leading up to another world war. Japan was pushed into a militaristic regime by 1933, and started stockpiling nickel as war materials. The Second Sino-Japanese War broke out in 1937 and a National Mobilization Law was declared in the following year. This action suspended the coinage act of 1897 and allowed the Japanese government to issue temporary subsidiary coins without obtaining approval from the Imperial Diet. New brass coins featuring a crow design on the obverse replaced the old copper paulownia coins on June 1, 1938. Brass was chosen as the previous composition contained tin which was a military-important metal not produced in Japan. The new crow design with waves and eight ridge mirrors on the back was made by combining submissions from a public offering. 

On November 29, 1938 the act was revised and one sen coins were struck in aluminum as copper was needed for munitions. The diameter of the one sen coin was reduced from 23 down to 17.6mm, while the weight dropped from 3.75 to 0.90 grams. Although the coins were now smaller and lighter, the crow and waves design did not change. Using aluminum allowed coins to be produced in large numbers because the alloy is naturally soft, did not require annealing, and extended the life of the dies. The design of the one sen coin changed again in 1941, featuring Mount Fuji on the reverse representing Hakkō ichiu. The obverse side shows the character "ichi" or "one" representing the value of the coin. This feature was allegedly handwritten by Isao Kawada, who was the minister of finance at the time. The diameter of the coin was reduced from 17.6 to 16mm while the weight dropped from 0.90 to 0.65 grams. In April 1943 the Japanese government announced plans to use tin in coinage as aluminum was now needed for more aircraft. One sen coins had their aluminum content dropped this year from 0.65 to 0.55g. As World War II drew to a close the amount of available aluminum became depleted. 

Tin and zinc eventually replaced aluminum for one sen coins when they were issued in March 1944. The final design used for the coins features a chrysanthemum crest with value on the obverse, and inscriptions on the reverse. Tin was not an ideal choice for money as the metal is heat-sensitive and soft, but the Japanese government had no alternatives.  Supplies came from occupied Southeast Asia where the metal was abundantly produced. One sen coins eventually became impossible to produce due to deteriorating conditions, and were discontinued when the war ended in 1945. Unissued one sen coins made of porcelain were produced in the final months of the war and were destroyed afterwards. One sen coins were eventually demonetized at the end of 1953 when the Japanese government passed a law abolishing subsidiary coinage in favor of the yen. Currencies of less than one yen were rarely used by this time due to excessive post-war inflation.

Composition

Circulation figures

Meiji

The following are circulation figures for one sen coins that were minted between the 6th, and 42nd year of Meiji's reign. The dates all begin with the Japanese symbol 明治 (Meiji), followed by the year of his reign the coin was minted. Each coin is read clockwise from right to left, so in the example used below "一十二" would read as "year 21" or 1888. Some of the mintages included cover more than one variety of a given coin.

"Year" ← "Number representing year of reign" ← "Emperors name" (Ex: 年 ← 一十二 ← 治明)

Taishō

The following are circulation figures for one sen coins that were minted between the 2nd and 13th year of Taishō's reign. The dates all begin with the Japanese symbol 大正 (Taishō), followed by the year of his reign the coin was minted. Each coin is read clockwise from right to left, so in the example used below "二十" would read as "year 12" or 1923.

"Year" ← "Number representing year of reign" ← "Emperors name" (Ex: 年 ← 二十 ← 正大)

Shōwa
The dates all begin with the Japanese symbol 昭和 (Shōwa), followed by the year of his reign the coin was minted. Each coin is read clockwise from right to left, so in the example used below "二十"  would read as "year 12" or 1937. Coin patterns that include examples struck on porcelain are not included here as they were never issued for circulation.

"Year" ← "Number representing year of reign" ← "Emperors name" (Ex: 年 ← 二十 ← 和昭)

Shōwa era designs
Five different designs were used during the Shōwa era for the 1 sen coin, not including pattern coins which were never intended for circulation. As the weight and sizes were changed frequently after 1937, these designs have been listed separate with their respective information.

Collecting
The value of any given coin is determined by survivability rate and condition as collectors in general prefer uncleaned appealing coins. One sen coins with the dragon design (1873 to 1888) have two main key dates which are worth the most. The first key date are coins dated 1873 (year 3) given their low mintage, while the second and rarest key date of the series are coins from 1881 (year 14) with the "large 4" variety. The latter of the two features slightly different strokes inside the character "four" (四), which makes the inner right stroke look like an obtuse angle. Copper subsidiary coinage including half sen, sen, and two sen coins all initially use a dragon design. All of these except one sen coins have two varieties made during 1877 as the scales were changed from a square to a "V" shape pattern. One sen coins received the change in 1880, and there is little difference in value when it comes to the design of the dragon's scales. The next rice wreath design (1898 to 1915) spanned two imperial eras. In general, coins dated towards the end of the Meiji era (1898 to 1902) are worth slightly more than those made under Emperor Taishō. The most valuable of these coins are dated from 1900 and 1902 (year 33 and 35). Finally, one sen coins with the paulownia design (1916 to 1938) have a single key date with 1930 (year 5 of Shōwa). The one sen coin eventually received a crow design in 1938 and production increased until the series ended in 1945. Collecting these later dates remains affordable as there are plenty of surviving coins.

See also

Penny, similar denominations in other currencies

Notes

References

Coins of Japan
Japanese sen
One-cent coins